Spanish Flat is an unincorporated community in Napa County, California. It lies at an elevation of 568 feet (173 m).

The graves of the desecrated cemetery of Monticello were relocated to Spanish Flat before the town and valley were inundated by Lake Berryessa.

In August 2020, Spanish Flat was evacuated due to the Hennessey Fire. The fire destroyed the majority of mobile homes in the Spanish Flat Mobile Villa, leaving only a small number of structures standing.

References

Unincorporated communities in Napa County, California
Vaca Mountains
Unincorporated communities in California